"What I eat in a day" videos are a current trend on several social media platforms, including Twitter, TikTok and YouTube. The videos consist of a person describing all the meals and snacks that they ate during a given day, often as part of a given diet. The videos have recently become increasingly popular, with some of them accumulating millions of views, and they are considered a very profitable industry for the people making them. However, some people have raised concerns that the videos may promote an unrealistic standard for healthy eating and contribute to the development of eating disorders.

Format 
These videos often feature a montage of the food that the creator eats over the course of the day, sometimes with the associated calorie count of the foods that they describe. Unlike related mukbang videos, however, in which participants eat large amounts of food, the diets described are often restrictive. However, other videos are labeled as "unhealthy" and depict large portion sizes and higher amounts of processed food.

Popularity 
"What I eat in a day" videos have existed for a long time, especially on YouTube, but they have become much more widespread in recent years. This phenomenon is self-reinforcing because when social media users watch or like these videos they are likely to see more of them in the future. Indeed, some of the most successful videos have tens of millions of view each.

Criticism and controversy 
Several dieticians and mental health professionals over the impacts that these videos can have, as they can advocate a restrictive style of eating and not "promote body diversity." They have also raised concerns that this trend could contribute to a rise in disordered eating, especially since use of social media is known to increase feelings of negative body image. This trend is particularly prevalent among young adults, which are also the group with the highest vulnerability to eating disorders.

More recently, a portion of these videos have begun to challenge diets and depict more realistic ways of eating in order to reduce the potential consequences of the trend.

See also 

 Dieting
 Social media and psychology

References 

Nutrition
Social media